Bosco Chocolate Syrup is a brand of chocolate syrup first produced in 1928.  The company, Bosco Products, Inc., is based in  Towaco, New Jersey, and products are sold throughout the United States and Europe.

History
Bosco Chocolate syrup was purportedly invented in 1928 in Camden, New Jersey, by an unknown physician. The William S. Scull Company, founded in 1931 in Camden, acquired the manufacturing license. The Scull Company's most famous product was Boscul Coffee, which gave the product its brand name, "Bosco". In the 1950s, Corn Products Company acquired the brands Bosco, and Bosco Products, Inc. in 1985. The name recalls the Greek word βόσκω, "I nourish."

The company has branched out and makes other products, including candy bars bearing the brand name.

Production process
Formerly, bulk materials were added via automatic measuring devices into stainless steel cooking vats.  Minor ingredients and flavorings were blended into the batch separately, through a custom blender device, adhering to stringent product handling standards.  While in the vats, Bosco was pasteurized for product uniformity and then cooled for bottling. Computers measured and monitored the product temperatures. Malt extract and vanilla was added and combined with cocoa powder, which yielded the distinctive Bosco taste.

As of 2020, Bosco no longer follows this process. The recipe now omits malt extract and vanilla, altering the flavor and viscosity of the product.

Bosco was once packaged in glass jars, but is now sold in plastic squeeze bottles.

As of 2015, Bosco is produced in several flavors in addition to the original chocolate: strawberry, sea salt caramel, fudge brownie, sugar free, and mocha (the last of which was added c. 2012, replacing berry blue).

Cultural references

Advertising
Bosco Chocolate Syrup, at that time called Bosco Milk Amplifier, was heavily advertised on children's shows during the late 1950s and early 1960s, such as The Popeye Club, a local Atlanta, Georgia, program featuring Popeye cartoons, as well as live action sequences.  An important feature of many of the television advertisements was the jingle, I love Bosco.
Bosco commercials were featured frequently as some of the "retromercials" used in lieu of commercial breaks on TV Land during its earliest years.
Bosco ads often featured the "Bosco Chiller-Diller" concoction.
Bosco TV and radio ads also featured the "Bosco Nova" song and dance, set to a bossa nova beat.

Art
Vik Muniz, a modern artist, is famous for recreating well-known works of art, such as The Last Supper by Leonardo da Vinci, entirely in Bosco Chocolate Syrup. A Bosco portrait by Muniz sold for $110,000 in 2007.

Books
 In 2001, Michael Moore's Stupid White Men... and Other Sorry Excuses for the State of the Nation!, stated that Bosco was one of a number of things "rendered useless by nature", along with the typewriter, college degrees, and the U.S. Supreme Court.

Film
 Bosco Chocolate Syrup was used as fake blood in Alfred Hitchcock's Psycho (1960), during the shower scene.
 Bosco Chocolate Syrup was also used as fake blood in George A. Romero's Night of the Living Dead (1968).
 Bosco is a favorite drink of the character Jamie in From the Mixed-Up Files of Mrs. Basil E. Frankweiler (1973).
 Bosco is mentioned by Leslie Nielsen in the film The Naked Gun: From the Files of Police Squad! (1988).
 Bosco is also mentioned by Bruce Willis in the film A Good Day to Die Hard (2013) while roasting his son Jack.

Music
Avant-garde saxophonist Marion Brown's Quartet performed a song titled "Bosco" on their La Placita album, recorded Live in Willisau, Switzerland on March 26, 1977.
English alternative rock band Placebo (band) released a song on their 2013 album Loud Like Love titled "Bosco" after the chocolate syrup.

Television
 In season seven of The Blacklist, while being interrogated by agent Ressler, Krilov requested (amongst others) a glass of chocolate milk, Redington interjected saying "Make it two. Hershey's or Nesquik? Or maybe you're a Bosco man."
 In season two of The Mary Tyler Moore Show, Murray is called to bring Ted Baxter a glass of milk, saying, "had I known it was for you, Ted, I'd have put some Bosco in it."
In the Season 4 Laverne and Shirley episode "Supermarket Sweep", Laverne wins a three-minute shopping spree at a local grocery store. All their friends request certain food items, but Lenny and Squiggy only want Bosco.
 In the MASH episode "Dear Mildred" (season 4, episode 8), Radar states his aunt would not let him dip his zwieback in his Bosco.
 In the Night Court episode "Hurricane" in season 3, Harry asks Mac to fix him a "stiff Bosco".
In the season 2 Seinfeld episode "The Baby Shower", George Costanza reveals that it was "Bosco" that Elaine Benes's friend, Leslie, threw on his new red collared shirt three years ago during her performance at a warehouse on the waterfront in Brooklyn that she invited him to on a date. She then left with another man, never apologizing, saying goodbye, or calling George again.
In the season 7 Seinfeld episode "The Secret Code", George Costanza reveals that he chose "Bosco" as his ATM PIN because of his great enthusiasm for Bosco Chocolate Syrup.
In the season 8 Seinfeld episode "The Fatigues", Jerry Seinfeld mentions that "Bosco" is one of the parts of comedian Kenny Bania’s poorly received milk-themed stand up act. 
 In The Sopranos, season 4, episode 7: "Watching Too Much Television", in reacting to a new espresso machine given to Adriana at her bridal shower, Joanne Moltisanti says of Adriana's fiance, Christopher Moltisanti: "Cappuccino now. He used to drink Bosco."
 In Married... with Children, season 4, episode "At the Zoo", Steve Rhoades refers to "Bosco" a sea turtle at the aquarium. Al Bundy, thinking Steve means the chocolate syrup brand, says, "You got Bosco!? I'll spit in a glass and we can mix some up!" 
 In Mork & Mindy, season 4, episode 17 "Midas Mork", Quentin (the butler?) says "Can I get you a before dinner Bosco?" to Mearth, who replies "No, you can’t get me a before dinner Bosco. You know why? You just like to say Bosco!", Quentin says "To be sure." and leaves.
 In Bob's Burgers, Sgt Bosco is a caustic and cantankerous officer who is involved in many of the Belchers' adventures.
 In “Who’s The Boss”, season 5, episode 14 “Winter Break”, Tony Micelli says “I brought along a couple of sandwiches that I made with peanut butter and marshmallow fluff, otherwise know as the fluffer-nutter. And you know what I brought along to wash it down with? A little chocolate milk made with Bosco!”

See also
 List of syrups

References

Sources

External links

Bosco syrup commercial with song "I love Bosco", YouTube 
Gallery of classic graphic design featuring Bosco

Bosco Chocolate Drink DICK VAN DYKE 1959 via YouTube
Bosco - Milk Amplifier.wmv

Food and drink companies based in New Jersey
Confectionery companies of the United States
Brand name chocolate
Syrup
Products introduced in 1928